The 1996 Michigan State Spartans football team competed on behalf of Michigan State University as a member of the Big Ten Conference during the 1996 NCAA Division I-A football season. Led by second-year head coach Nick Saban, the Spartans compiled an overall record of 6–6 with a mark of 5–3, tying for fifth place in the Big Ten. Michigan State was invited to the Sun Bowl, where they lost to Stanford, 38–0, on December 31. The team played home games at Spartan Stadium in East Lansing, Michigan.

Schedule

Roster

1997 NFL Draft
The following players were selected in the 1997 NFL Draft.

References

Michigan State
Michigan State Spartans football seasons
Michigan State Spartans football